Braunschweiger Schultheaterwoche is a theatre festival in Germany.

External links
 

Theatre festivals in Germany
Events in Lower Saxony
Culture in Braunschweig